Fifa 1994 may refer to:

1994 FIFA World Cup finals
1994 FIFA World Cup

1994 FIFA World Cup qualification
1994 FIFA World Cup qualification

EA Sports video game series
FIFA International Soccer